Fransisco Aupa Indongo (born January 15 1936), is a prominent Namibian businessman and former politician. He  owns Continental Enterprises, Indongo Toyota, Frans Indongo Gardens, Farm Gelukwater, Select Service and Gas Station and various shares in mining and fishing companies in Namibia. He is the father-in-law of prominent lawyer Sisa Namandje and prominent banker Wosman Hamukonda. He is third on the list of Namibia's top ten richest people, behind the Pupkewitz and Olthaver & List families.

Business career
Indongo opened his first business, which made bricks, in the late 1950s. With the profits from that business, he bought sewing equipment for cloth making, which he sold in Oranjemund. In 1961, he opened a small shop in Omusimboti, Oshana which eventually allowed him to open a chain of supermarkets across the country. Indongo owns a large number of properties across Namibia, including prominent locations in Swakopmund, Tsumeb, Walvis Bay, Otjiwarongo and Windhoek as well as holdings in the sugar and fishing industries.
He is a very well known successful entrepreneur

Political career
Indongo entered politics in the 1970s as a leading member of the National Democratic Party, which became part of the Democratic Turnhalle Alliance following the completion of the Turnhalle Constitutional Conference in 1977. At the Turnhalle Conference, Indongo was an important member of the Ovamboland delegation. He was Minister of Economic Affairs in the Owambo legislative assembly from 1975 and from 1980 a Minister in the Owambo Second Tier Representative Authority. In 1982, he was a founding member of the Christian Democratic Action for Social Justice, led by Peter Kalangula. He resigned from politics in the late 1980s to manage his business affairs.

Honours
In 2001, Indongo received an honorary doctorate in business administration from the University of Namibia. In 2003, a street was named after him in downtown Windhoek.
Indongo owns Etango Complex in Oshakati, one of the highest standard buildings in northern Namibia.

See also
 Monica Kalondo
Sven Thieme

References

External links 

 Interview with Dr. Frans Indongo by Bertil Högberg on 15 June 2005 within the project Nordic Documentation on the Liberation Struggle in Southern Africa

1936 births
Living people
Namibian businesspeople
People from Oshana Region
Popular Democratic Movement politicians
Ovambo people
University of Namibia alumni
National Democratic Party (Namibia) politicians
Christian Democratic Action for Social Justice politicians
Government ministers of Namibia
20th-century businesspeople
21st-century businesspeople
20th-century Namibian politicians